Madeline Rees George (25 May 1851 — 17 June 1931), often written M. Rees George, was a teacher in Germany and in South Australia. She was at various times proprietor of her own school, and headmistress of the Advanced School for Girls and Adelaide Girls' High School. She was one of the best known figures in education circles in South Australia.
Her sister Marian Rees George (c. 1855 – 23 July 1938) taught French at the same institutions and retired in 1936.

History
Miss George was born in Lewisham, Kent, a daughter of Francis George, a London solicitor. She was educated in England and Germany. She had teaching experience at Kissingen, Wiesbaden, and Munich and came to Australia in 1879. She joined the South Australian Education Department in 1880 as the foundation teacher of languages (German in particular) in the Advanced School for Girls. In 1885 she resigned to conduct a school of her own at North Adelaide ("Miss Woolcock's school"), but in 1886 was invited to return to the department as headmistress of the Advanced School. She held this post until 1908 when the school was merged into the Adelaide Girls High School, and she was made headmistress of the new institution, in the same Grote Street premises. She resigned from the department in 1913.

Miss George made trips to England in 1900 and 1907, when she went as a delegate to the first League of the Empire conference held in London, and again in 1913. She died at North Adelaide, aged 80. She never married.

Other interests
She was in 1904 one of the founders and first secretary of the Adelaide branch of the League of the Empire.
One of the greatest ambitions in Miss George's life was to raise £300 through the League of the Empire to enable the statue of Charles Sturt to be erected in Adelaide.

Family
Marian Rees George (c. 1855 – 23 July 1938) was her sister and French mistress at both the Advanced School and Adelaide High. She lived at Childers Street, North Adelaide.

Another sister, Ella "Nellie" Rees George (c. 1853 – 31 May 1948), married John Holland Robertson on 22 January 1878. He, with his brothers Robert and William owned Calperum and Chowilla stations. They were neighbours and friends of the Cudmore family.

References

External links
Rees George, Madeline (1851–1931) in the Australian Dictionary of Biography

Australian headmistresses
1851 births
1931 deaths
19th-century Australian educators
20th-century Australian educators
19th-century Australian women
20th-century Australian women
19th-century women educators
20th-century women educators